The Remote Telescope Markup Language (RTML) is an XML dialect for controlling remote and/or robotic telescopes. It is used to describe various telescope parameters (such as coordinates and exposure time) to facilitate observation of selected targets. RTML instructions were designed to be displayed in a more human-readable way; they are then processed and executed by telescopes through local parsers.

It was created by UC Berkeley's Hands-On Universe project in 1999. Because of its XML structure and consequent flexibility readability, it is now widely used, and has become an international standard for astronomical imaging.

References

External links
 http://hou.lbl.gov/rtml/
 http://www.astro.physik.uni-goettingen.de/~hessman/RTML/
 http://www.handsonuniverse.org/

XML-based standards
Robotic telescopes